St. Martin's Priory, Richmond was a medieval monastic house in North Yorkshire, England.  It was a Benedictine house, founded about 1100, originally for 9 or 10 monks, dependent on St Mary's Abbey, York. As one of the lesser monastic houses, it was dissolved in 1539.

References

 

Monasteries in North Yorkshire
Richmond, North Yorkshire